Klepikovsky District is an administrative and municipal district (raion), one of the twenty-five in Ryazan Oblast, Russia. It is located in the north of the oblast. Its administrative center is the town of Spas-Klepiki. Population: 25,476 (2010 Census);  The population of Spas-Klepiki accounts for 23.2% of the district's total population.

Economy and transportation
The Mesherskoye peat narrow gauge railway serves a peat factory which became operational in 2013.

Notable residents 

Abram Arkhipov (1862–1930), realist artist, born in the village of Yegorovo

References

Notes

Sources

Districts of Ryazan Oblast